David Samanez Ocampo (4 November 1865 – 13 July 1947)1, the son of José Samanez, served as Interim President of Peru, officially as the President of the Southern Junta, during the transitional period of March to December 1931. He oversaw changes to the electoral statutes that effectively brought the vote to the masses, leading to the critical – if highly controversial – presidential election of December 1931, when Sánchez Cerro defeated Victor Raúl Haya de la Torre. Instrumental in his appointment was his reputation and high prestige among politicians of all factions.

Democratic Party
Ocampo entered politics at an early age, joining the Democratic Party.

Revival of Electoral Law
One of the widely appreciated achievement of Ocampo's eight-month presidency was the revival of the electoral laws. This he did by drafting a special committee composed of the likes of, among others, Luis E. Valcárcel, Jorge Basadre Grohmann and Luis Alberto Sanchez. The committee established the secret ballot system and introduced provisions for the representation of minorities in the electoral system. The committee also introduced technological innovations to the electoral system, ridding it of the many redundancies.

References

1. "David Samanez Ocampo". geneanet.org. Retrieved 28 February 2017.

1866 births
1947 deaths
Presidents of Peru